The Real World: Stockholm was the first reality television show to be broadcast on Swedish television. Based on the successful American TV show The Real World, the show premiered on 1 October 1995 on TV1000. Following the show's success, The Real World: Visby aired in 1996, but it became the last Real World season in Sweden following poor ratings. 

The Real World: Visby was broadcast on TV1000 and ZTV in late 1996. It served as second season of the show after the success of The Real World: Stockholm. It was the last Swedish season as the ratings dropped too low.

References
Citations

General

External links
The Real World:Stockholm

Stockholm
Mass media in Stockholm
1995 Swedish television series debuts
1995 in Sweden
1996 Swedish television series endings
Television shows set in Sweden